D504 is a state road in Lika region of Croatia connecting the D1 state road to Ličko Petrovo Selo border crossing to Bihać, Bosnia and Herzegovina via the D217 state road.

The road, as well as all other state roads in Croatia, is managed and maintained by Hrvatske ceste, state owned company.

Traffic volume 

Traffic is regularly counted and reported by Hrvatske ceste, operator of the road. Substantial seasonal variations of the traffic volume is attributed to summer tourist traffic.

Road junctions and populated areas

See also
 State roads in Croatia
 Hrvatske ceste

Sources

State roads in Croatia
Lika-Senj County